The Musée Granet is a museum in the quartier Mazarin, Aix-en-Provence, France devoted to painting, sculpture and archeology. In 2011, the museum received 177,598 visitors.

History
The museum, adjacent to the Church of Saint-Jean-de-Malte, first opened in 1838 in buildings previously belonging to the priory of Saint-Jean-de-Malte. It still shares a common garden with the church.

Permanent collection
It recently underwent significant restoration and reorganization, prior to the international exhibition in 2006 marking the centenary of Cézanne's death. Due to lack of space, the large archeological collection, including many recent discoveries, will be displayed in a new museum, still in the planning stages. The museum contains major paintings by Jean-Dominique Ingres (among which the monumental "Jupiter and Thetis"), an authentic self-portrait by Rembrandt and works by Anthony van Dyck, Paul Cézanne, Alberto Giacometti and Nicolas de Staël.

Planque collection
In June 2011, the first part of the collection of the Fondation Jean et Suzanne Planque opened at the Musée Granet, containing over 180 artworks. This legacy of the Swiss painter, dealer and art collector Jean Planque, a personal friend of Pablo Picasso, has been donated to the city for an initial period of 15 years. The collection contains over 300 works of art, including paintings and drawings by Degas, Renoir. Gauguin, Monet, Cézanne, Van Gogh, Picasso, Pierre Bonnard, Paul Klee, Fernand Léger, Giacometti and Dubuffet. The full collection will be housed in a specially constructed annex in the Chapelle des Pénitents Blancs, situated nearby: the expected opening is in 2013.

Gallery

Notes

References

External links 

   Homepage of Musée Granet

Art museums and galleries in France
Granet